Olympic Arena may refer to:

 Olympic Arena, the United States Air Force Missile Combat Competition
 Hellinikon Olympic Arena in Ellinikon, Athens, Greece, built for the 2004 Olympics and Paralympics
 Jeunesse Arena, Barra da Tijuca, Rio de Janeiro, Brazil, also called Arena Olímpica do Rio (Rio Olympic Arena)
 Father David Bauer Olympic Arena, an ice hockey arena in Calgary, Alberta, Canada
 Copper Box Arena in the Queen Elizabeth Olympic Park in Hackney Wick, London, England, used for the 2012 Summer Olympics
 Olympic Gymnastics Arena in the Olympic Park, Bangi-dong, Songpa-gu, Seoul, South Korea, constructed for the 1988 Olympics
 Herb Brooks Arena, formerly Olympic Center Arena, Lake Placid, New York, built for the 1980 Winter Olympics
 Vikingskipet Olympic Arena in Hamar, Norway, built for the 1994 Winter Olympics